Thara may refer to:

 Terah, father of Abraham
 Thara (1970 film), a 1970 Indian Malayalam film
 Thara, Gujarat, a town in north Gujarat, India
 Thara Ak-Var, a DC Comics character 
 Thara Prashad (born 1982), American singer
 Thara (album), 2007

See also
 Tara (disambiguation)
 Thera (disambiguation)